Patrick O'Donovan (born 21 March 1977) is an Irish Fine Gael politician who has served as a Minister of State since May 2016. He has been a Teachta Dála (TD) for the Limerick County constituency since 2016, and from 2011 to 2016 for the Limerick constituency.

He was a member of Limerick County Council for the Newcastle West local electoral area from 2003 to 2011.

In January 2014, he called for "tougher controls on the use of open source internet browsers and payment systems" which he claimed allowed users to remain anonymous in the illegal trade of drugs, weapons and pornography.

On 19 May 2016, he was appointed by the new government formed after the February 2016 election led by Enda Kenny as Minister of State at the Department of Transport, Tourism and Sport with responsibility for Tourism and Sport. On 20 June 2017, he was appointed by the new government led by Leo Varadkar as Minister of State at the Department of Public Expenditure and Reform and at the Department of Finance with responsibility for Public Procurement, Open Government and eGovernment. On 1 July 2020, he was appointed by the new government formed after the February 2020 election led by Micheál Martin as Minister of State at the Department of Public Expenditure and Reform, with responsibility for the Office of Public Works.

In August 2017, he claimed in an interview with the Sunday Independent, that the Provisional IRA were responsible for the Dublin and Monaghan bombings. Fine Gael declined to comment on the matter.

In December 2022, he was re-appointed to the same position, as well as Minister of State at the Department of Tourism, Culture, Arts, Gaeltacht, Sport and Media with special responsibility for the Gaeltacht following the appointment of Leo Varadkar as Taoiseach.

References

External links

Patrick O'Donovan's page on the Fine Gael website

1977 births
Living people
Fine Gael TDs
Local councillors in County Limerick
Members of the 31st Dáil
Members of the 32nd Dáil
Members of the 33rd Dáil
Ministers of State of the 32nd Dáil
Ministers of State of the 33rd Dáil